Apeiba tibourbou is a tree native to Caatinga and Cerrado vegetation in Brazil,  and Costa Rica. It is used as an alternative fiber crop to make paper. It is found in Mexico, Central America, and the northern part of South America.

This fast-growing tree typically reaches 15 meters tall, though it can reach 25 meters in some habitats. The star-shaped yellow flowers give way to dry capsules covered with soft green spines. The leaves are pointed at the tip and rounded at the base, 10-30 centimeters long and 6-12 centimeters wide, borne on petioles 1-3 centimeters long. The leaf margins are lightly serrated, and the veins are lightly hairy.

The wood is light and floats easily, so it is used to make buoys and small boats.

References

External links
   Instituto Nacional de Biodiversidad: Apeiba tibourbou photo

tibourbou
Trees of Brazil
Trees of Costa Rica
Flora of the Cerrado
Trees of Peru